The term Victory International or Victory Internationals  refers to two series of international football matches played by the national football teams of England, Scotland, Ireland and Wales at the end of both the First and  Second World Wars. The matches were organised to celebrate the Victory of the Allied Powers in both wars. The term specifically refers to those matches played after the conflicts were over, making them distinct from the wartime internationals which were played during the course of the wars.

Among the games regarded as Victory Internationals were those played as part of the 1945–46 British Victory Home Championship. The 1945–46 season also saw England play Victory internationals against France, Switzerland and Belgium. Scotland also played the latter two national teams. The status of these internationals is open to debate. England, Ireland and Wales do not recognize any of these games as full internationals. Scotland, however, does list the games against Belgium and Switzerland as full internationals. Similarly, Belgium, Switzerland and France all regard their Victory Internationals as full internationals.

World War I matches (1919)

World War II matches (1945–46)

See also
England national football team results (unofficial matches)
Scotland national football team results (unofficial matches)
Wales wartime national football team results
List of Scotland wartime international footballers

References

1918–19 in English football
1919–20 in English football
1918–19 in Scottish football
1919–20 in Scottish football
1945–46 in English football
1945–46 in Scottish football
1945–46 in Irish association football
1945–46 in European football
1918–19 in European football
1919–20 in European football
Association football terminology
1945–46 in Belgian football
1945–46 in French football
Wartime association football